Humac (Cyrillic: Хумац) is a village in Bosnia and Herzegovina. According to the 1991 census, the village is located in the municipality of Ljubuški.

It was the site where the Humac tablet, an Old Slavic Cyrillic stone tablet, was found.

Demographics 
According to the 2013 census, its population was 2,775.

Notable people
Vjekoslav "Maks" Luburić, Croatian World War II concentration camp commandant and war criminal

References

Populated places in Ljubuški